Coleophora falkovitshella is a moth of the family Coleophoridae. It is found in Mongolia and Korea.

Coleophora falkovitshella is the replacement name for Coleophora cornutella.

References

falkovitshella
Moths of Japan
Moths of Korea
Moths of Asia
Moths described in 1984